Is It Legal? is a British television sitcom set in a solicitors office in Hounslow, west London, which ran from 12 September 1995 to 9 December 1998. It was produced by Hartswood Films and was shown on ITV for Series 1–2 and Channel 4 for Series 3. It was written by Simon Nye, who also wrote other ITV sitcoms such as Men Behaving Badly and Hardware.

Cast
Richard Lumsden – Colin Lotus
Jeremy Clyde – Dick Spackman (Series 1–2)
Imelda Staunton – Stella Phelps
Patrick Barlow – Bob Birch
Kate Isitt – Alison
Matthew Ashforde – Darren
Nicole Arumugam – Sarah Chivers

Guest stars
John Thomson – Paramedic in "Death In Hounslow"
Jono Coleman – Radio DJ in "Hounslow FM"
Ben Miles – Tom in "Alison Gets Laid"
Chris Langham – Mr Etherington in "Darren's Revenge"
Alexander Armstrong – Nick in "New Bloke"
Kate Lonergan – Mrs Beath in "Office Party"

Characters

Colin Lotus
Lotus is the junior partner of the firm and succeeded his father once he had retired. Colin is very proud to be a solicitor and is enthusiastic about his work but unfortunately he is naive and very often makes stupid mistakes and it is usually down to Bob to sort out the mess he has made.

He is very helpful to the rest of the firm despite the fact that they all think he is annoying and that he is very strange. He is a bachelor who only has his dog Tucker for company.  He remained a bachelor despite having a one-night stand with the wife of a client who was imprisoned in "Office Party".  In "Glad To Be Colin" and "New Bloke" he started a relationship with Sarah who had appeared in the previous two series as the delivery girl from Mr. Bappy, the sandwich shop that was below the office. As a result, there was tension between Colin and Bob as Bob used to have a crush on Sarah and he contemplated having a relationship with her.

Dick Spackman
Spackman is one of the senior partners of the firm, but his knowledge of law is limited. Dick is very arrogant and often disregards others to make his life more convenient. Most of his time is spent in his office drinking glasses of sherry, watching golf on the television and not doing any work. He sees his position in the firm as bringing the work in which is completed by Stella, Bob or Colin. Dick's last appearance in the series was in "Indecision." In "A Question of Pants" it was revealed that Dick had taken early retirement and therefore Stella became the sole senior partner of the firm.

Stella Phelps
Stella Phelps is the senior partner of the firm and had an ambition of being a solicitor since childhood, and always tried to succeed in being the most professional solicitor. However, the rest of the firm, especially partners Colin and Dick, hold her back because of their inept attitude towards law and the legal profession.

Bob Birch
Bob is the office manager of Lotus, Spackman & Phelps, and is, aside from Stella, probably the most competent employee of the firm. A very dedicated worker, Bob tends toward bossiness and is a bit of a prude, which tends to grate on many of his co-workers. He fell in love with Sarah, a worker at the sandwich shop – "Mr. Bappy" – which is located in the same building as the firm. Bob pursued her—despite her apparent lack of interest and his allergy to bread products, which eventually led to the dissolution of his marriage and a drawer full of odd-flavoured baps. During the third series, he and Stella became a couple.

Alison
Alison is the sexy secretary who has a job at the firm only because her estate agent boyfriend sends them a lot of clients looking for conveyancing work to be done. She is constantly bored and likes to annoy the other members of the firm, particularly Bob, because of his crush on Sarah.

Darren
Darren is the firm's office assistant and general jack-of-all-trades. Generally seen as incompetent at his job, but remains on good terms with Bob and Colin despite Stella's obvious dislike of him. His object of affection is Alison.

Episodes

Filming locations
Interior shots were filmed at Teddington Studios in south-west London

Exterior shots were filmed in and around Staines and Walton-on-Thames.

Awards
It won the British Comedy Award for "Best ITV Sitcom" in 1995.

DVD releases
All three series of Is It Legal? were released on DVD by Network between September 2010 and March 2011.

External links

Is It Legal? on the Hartswood Films website

1995 British television series debuts
1998 British television series endings
1990s British legal television series
1990s British sitcoms
1990s British workplace comedy television series
Carlton Television
Channel 4 sitcoms
English-language television shows
ITV sitcoms
London Borough of Hounslow
Television series by Hartswood Films
Television series by ITV Studios
Television shows set in London
Television shows shot at Teddington Studios